Cheonan–Asan station  is a ground-level train station located mostly in Asan, Chungcheongnam-do, although part of it lies in the neighboring city of Cheonan.  This station serves high-speed KTX trains that run from Seoul to either Busan or Mokpo.  It is connected to (and it is possible to transfer to trains which stop at) Asan station, a railway station on the Janghang Line which is also served by Line 1 of the Seoul Subway.

History
The location of Cheonan–Asan was finalised on June 14, 1993, though construction did not begin until July 22, 1996.  The planned name of "Onyangoncheon" was changed to "Cheonan–Asan" on November 20, 2003, and the station building was completed on March 27 the following year.  The station opened for business four days later, on April 1, 2004.

On March 30, 2007, Asan station was opened as a transfer station on the Janghang Line, soon to be integrated into the latest extension of Line 1 of the Seoul Subway.

Services
Cheonan–Asan station serves select KTX trains on the Gyeongbu High Speed Railway and Honam High Speed Railway lines. (KTX services calling at Suwon do not pass through Cheonan–Asan, and not all KTX trains that do pass through will stop at this station).

Station layout

Gallery

See also
 Transportation in South Korea
 Korail
 KTX

References

External links
 Cheonan–Asan Station on Doas
Korea Train eXpress
Route Map
 Cheonan–Asan station information from Korail

Railway stations in South Chungcheong Province
Railway stations opened in 2004
Korea Train Express stations